Lomnice is a municipality and village in Bruntál District in the Moravian-Silesian Region of the Czech Republic. It has about 500 inhabitants.

Administrative parts
The village of Tylov is an administrative part of Lomnice.

Notable people
Fanny Neuda (1819–1894), writer

References

Villages in Bruntál District